Harry Hannus (born 20 December 1949) is a Finnish former racing cyclist. He won the Finnish national road race title seven times between 1972 and 1984. He also competed at four consecutive Olympic Games between 1972 and 1984.

References

External links
 

1949 births
Living people
Finnish male cyclists
People from Porvoo
Olympic cyclists of Finland
Cyclists at the 1972 Summer Olympics
Cyclists at the 1976 Summer Olympics
Cyclists at the 1980 Summer Olympics
Cyclists at the 1984 Summer Olympics
Sportspeople from Uusimaa